Constantin Stăncescu (20 October 1837, Bucharest – 8 June 1909, Bucharest) was a Romanian painter, art critic, teacher and translator.

Biography

He was born into a wealthy family. He initially studied law, but also took drawing and painting lessons from Gheorghe Tattarescu. In 1857, he competed for a travel scholarship; presenting five works, four of which were based on works by Tattarescu. His primary competitor for the money was Nicolae Grigorescu, who would become one of Romania's greatest artists. Stăncescu's victory is generally ascribed to social status, as Grigorescu was from a peasant family.

At the last minute, the travel destination was changed from Italy to France, for unknown reasons. As a result, he was enrolled at the École Nationale Supérieure des Beaux-Arts in Paris, where his primary instructor was Charles Gleyre. His studies, meant to take three years, actually lasted for seven, and his scholarship had to be extended. In 1864, he requested another extension, so he could study in Italy. The request was granted, and he left for Rome. He returned to Romania in the summer of 1865; an "event" that he advertised in the newspapers

He also gave speeches on art history and aesthetics, and wrote art criticism for numerous journals. His pieces were known for their overblown rhetoric and occasional misuse of  terminology. He did. however, continue to participate in the "Exhibition of Living Artists", held periodically at the The National School of Fine Arts, and promote himself vigorously. 

This eventually resulted in his obtaining a teaching position at the school. In 1892, he was named Director, succeeding his mentor, Tattarescu, who had no doubt recommended him for the position. This automatically made him a member of several commissions responsible for awarding grants and scholarships, as well as giving him seats on the juries of art exhibitions. He is also credited with being one of the founders of the Romanian Athenaeum. His students included many familiar names, such as Constantin Brâncuși, Jean Steriadi, Camil Ressu, Ștefan Luchian, and Nicolae Petrescu-Găină. 

Over the years, he painted less and less and, at some point, stopped altogether. He was virtually forgotten when he died. Few of his paintings have made it into museums. Most of his drawings have been lost.

References

External links

History of the Romanian Athenaeum

1837 births
1909 deaths
Romanian painters
Romanian art critics
Romanian art directors
Artists from Bucharest